The Essential Boz Scaggs is a compilation album by American musician and songwriter Boz Scaggs, released in 2013. The album includes songs from his studio albums from 1969 to 2013.

Reception 

Stephen Thomas Erlewine from AllMusic considered the album to be superior to the 1997 compilation My Time: A Boz Scaggs Anthology and that the record was "something close to a truly essential Boz Scaggs".

Track listing 
All tracks written by Boz Scaggs, except where noted.

Disc one

Disc two

Personnel 
 Boz Scaggs – guitar, vocals
 Booker T & The MG's - feature artists (Vocals) (track 10 disc 2)
 Fred Tackett –  guitar
 Louis Shelton – guitar
 David Hungate – bass
Jeff Porcaro — drums
David Paich — Hammond organ, piano, Minimoog, Moog synthesizer
 Vincent DeRosa – horns
 Jim Horn – horns
 Paul Hubinon – horns
 Dick Hyde – horns
 Plas Johnson – horns
 Tom Scott – horns
 Bud Shank – horns

Release history

References 

Boz Scaggs albums
2013 compilation albums
Columbia Records compilation albums
Legacy Recordings compilation albums